Walkinshaw is a surname of Scottish origin. The surname is a habitational name derived from  Walkinshaw in Renfrewshire. The name probably originates from the Old English wealcere "fuller" + sceaga "copse".

People
Alex Walkinshaw, (born 1974), English, an actor
Clementina Walkinshaw, (1720–1802), a mistress of Charles Edward Stuart (Bonnie Prince Charlie)
Lawrence H. Walkinshaw, (1904–1993), American ornithologist
Tom Walkinshaw (1946-2010), Scottish race car driver
Tom Walkinshaw (entrepreneur) (early 21st c.), Scottish entrepreneur

Fictional Characters
Theodore Walkinshaw, a character in the stage play Foggerty's Fairy (1881) by W. S. Gilbert.
Walkinshaw, an alias briefly assigned to Pongo Twistleton in the short story "Uncle Fred Flits By" (1935) by P. G. Wodehouse

See also
Clan Walkinshaw, a Scottish clan.
Tom Walkinshaw Racing, a racing car team.
Walkinshaw Performance

References